Kanwar Sain, also spelt as Rai Bahadur Kanwar Sain Gupta OBE (1899–1979) was a civil engineer from Haryana state in India. He was the chief engineer in the Bikaner state who came up with idea of Rajasthan Canal. He also successfully implemented Ganga canal project.  He was considered a dynamite of irrigation engineering of his time. 
He was born in 1899 in Tohana  district Fatehabad  (Haryana). He was educated at D.A.V. College, Lahore. He graduated as a civil engineer from Thomason College of Civil Engineering, Roorkee (now, IIT Roorkee) in the year 1927 with hons. He was awarded Padma Bhushan in 1956. He has written a book called -Reminiscences of an engineer.
He was chairman of Central Water and Power Commission, Ministry of Irrigation and Power, Government of India.
Kanwar sain and Karpov (1967) presented enveloping curves for Indian rivers.

Career
During his 80 years Dr. Kanwar Sain won great honours, including Order of the British Empire, O.B.E., and Padma Bhushan.
He was offered the Order of the Elephant by the Government of Thailand, but could not accept it, as he was serving with the United Nations. He was elected as President of Central Board of Irrigation and Power in 1953, Vice President of International Commission on Irrigation and Drainage 1954 and President of Institute of Engineers India in 1956.

He was awarded Honorary Life Membership by the American Society of Civil Engineers and Honorary Life Fellowship by the Institution of Engineers India. His own alma mater, the University of Roorkee (now Indian Institute of Technology, Roorkee), conferred on him an honorary doctorate of engineering. For nearly half a century, the name of Dr. Kanwar Sain has been a byword for river projects and development of water resources both in India and abroad. He was closely connected with major projects-from the Damodar Valley to the Rajasthan Canal, from Hirakud Dam, to the Narmada River Project.

Besides, he contributed his utmost in design and building up the Central Water and power Commission Dr. Sain's passionate involvement with his work - especially in saving Dibrugarh from floods and during the mishap at the Bhakra Dam, endeared him to his colleagues, both in India and abroad. His greatest achievement was his association with the Mekong Development Project for nine years as an UN expert.
He has also been associated with the preparation of a master plan for the development of the Narmada River. this man imported person in raj. state.

References 

Indian civil engineers
Canal engineers
1899 births
People from Hisar district
Rajasthani people
Recipients of the Padma Bhushan in civil service
People from Bikaner
1979 deaths
Indian irrigation engineers
Officers of the Order of the British Empire
20th-century Indian engineers
Engineers from Rajasthan